David Gilbert (born 1967 in Paris) is an American author known for the novels & Sons, The Normals, and for Remote Feed, a collection of short stories.

Early life and education

Gilbert's father was S. Parker Gilbert, the Chairman of Morgan Stanley during the 1980s and his grandfather was Seymour Parker Gilbert, the Assistant Secretary of the Treasury and the Agent General for Reparations to Germany, from October 1924 to May 1930. He grew up on the Upper East Side of Manhattan, graduated from Middlebury College, and earned an MFA in fiction writing from the University of Montana.

Career
His published work includes the novels & Sons, The Normals, and Remote Feed, a collection of short stories. His writings have appeared in periodicals such as GQ, Harper's and The New Yorker.

Personal life

Gilbert lives in New York City and has three children.

Bibliography

Novels

Collections

Short fiction

References

External links
 David Gilbert explores fatherly bonds in '& Sons'
 New Yorker Interview July 4, 2014
 www.davidgilbertauthor.com
 New Yorker Interview July 22, 2013
 New Yorker Interview November 5, 2012
 A Conversation Between David Gilbert and Amor Towles
 David Gilbert, Minding the family business, BookPage Interview by Alden Mudge

Living people
21st-century American novelists
Middlebury College alumni
Writers from Manhattan
1967 births
American male novelists
University of Montana alumni
21st-century American male writers
Novelists from New York (state)
Auchincloss family
People from the Upper East Side